Sharon Jeanette Macdonald (* 1961) is a British anthropologist and museologist.

Career 
In 1987, Macdonald received her Ph.D. from the University of Oxford and subsequently taught at Brunel University and Keele University. From 1996 until 2004, she was a lecturer, then 2005 a reader in cultural anthropology, both at the University of Sheffield. In 2006, she held a position as professor of social anthropology at the University of Manchester. She was appointed as anniversary professor in the Department of Sociology at the University of York in 2015. There, she led the "Profusion" theme in the Heritage Futures project. In 2015, she accepted the call for an Alexander von Humboldt professorship at the Humboldt University of Berlin. Together with the support of the Prussian Cultural Heritage Foundation and the Natural History Museum in Berlin, she established the Centre for Anthropological Research on Museums and Heritage (CARMAH). Apart from the Alexander von Humboldt professorship, she was appointed as a regular professor at the Institute for European Ethnology at the Humboldt University of Berlin. Beside her professorial appointments, she is participating in the collaborative formation of the Humboldt Forum.

In 2011, she was a guest professor at Peking University. She is a fellow of the Royal Anthropological Institute of Great Britain and Ireland and the Royal Historical Society.

Research 
The red thread in Macdonald's research is how different societies choose artefacts and, more generally, the relevant topics for exhibition in museums, given the fact that most museums display only 5% of their inventory to the public. In Germany, she did this in relation to National Socialism in Nuremberg promoted by a Humboldt scholarship from 2000 until 2006. More recently, she lays a focus on the representation of Islam in museums, alongside her more overarching topics of looting and colonialism in museums.

External links 

 CARMAH Homepage
 Sharon Macdonald's profile (Institute for European Ethnology, Humboldt University of Berlin)
 Humboldt professorship awarded to Sharon Macdonald
 Interview with Daniela Siebert, Deutschlandfunk Kultur, 2015 (in German)

References 

Living people
British anthropologists
British women anthropologists
Fellows of the Royal Anthropological Institute of Great Britain and Ireland
1961 births
Museologists